Plaza Libertad, formerly known as Plaza Alfonso XII, is a historic urban park in Iloilo City, Philippines. It is considered the site where the flag of the first Philippine Republic was raised in triumph after Spain surrendered Iloilo, the last Spanish capital in the Philippines, to the revolutionary forces led by Gen. Martin Delgado on December 25, 1898.

Plaza Libertad is located in front of Iloilo City Hall in Iloilo City Proper and is one of the six district plazas in Iloilo City.

History 
Plaza Alfonso XII, named after a king of Spain, was constructed in the 1800s and is one of the oldest plazas in the Philippines. It was surrounded by most of the government offices in Iloilo.

On Christmas Day of 1898, Governor-General Diego de los Ríos of Spain surrendered to the Filipino revolutionary troops led by General Martin Delgado in the Plaza, thus ending the 333-hundred-year-old Spanish colonization of the Philippines. After which, the triumphant revolutionaries for the first time raised the flag of the First Philippine Republic in Iloilo City, the last bastion of Spanish power in the country. It was later renamed to Plaza Libertad to reflect the event that happened on the plaza.

On November 17, 2003, the National Historical Institute declared Plaza Libertad as a national historical landmark.

Rehabilitation 

On February 4, 2021, the rehabilitation of the plaza started with a cost of ₱19 million, funded by the national government through the Tourism Infrastructure and Enterprise Zone Authority (TIEZA) of the Department of Tourism. The rehab includes trimming of trees, landscaping, improvement of facilities, and lighting, among others.

References 

Plazas in the Philippines
Landmarks in the Philippines
Tourist attractions in Iloilo City
History of Iloilo City